Leisure Knoll is an unincorporated community and census-designated place (CDP) located within Manchester Township, in Ocean County, New Jersey, United States. As of the 2010 United States Census, the CDP's population was 2,490.

Geography
According to the United States Census Bureau, the CDP had a total area of 0.895 square miles (2.317 km2), including 0.888 square miles (2.299 km2) of land and 0.007 square miles (0.018 km2) of water (0.80%).

Demographics

Census 2010

Census 2000
As of the 2000 United States Census there were 2,467 people, 1,540 households, and 845 families living in the CDP. The population density was 1,082.4/km2 (2,788.1/mi2). There were 1,634 housing units at an average density of 716.9/km2 (1,846.7/mi2). The racial makeup of the CDP was 98.87% White, 0.45% African American, 0.28% Asian, 0.04% Pacific Islander, 0.16% from other races, and 0.20% from two or more races. Hispanic or Latino of any race were 0.73% of the population.

There were 1,540 households, out of which none had children under the age of 18 living with them, 51.1% were married couples living together, 3.1% had a female householder with no husband present, and 45.1% were non-families. 43.1% of all households were made up of individuals, and 40.8% had someone living alone who was 65 years of age or older. The average household size was 1.60 and the average family size was 2.06.

In the CDP the population was spread out, with 0.1% under the age of 18, 0.2% from 18 to 24, 1.1% from 25 to 44, 13.9% from 45 to 64, and 84.7% who were 65 years of age or older. The median age was 75 years. For every 100 females, there were 68.7 males. For every 100 females age 18 and over, there were 68.8 males.

The median income for a household in the CDP was $36,207, and the median income for a family was $41,741. Males had a median income of $41,964 versus $27,727 for females. The per capita income for the CDP was $25,012. About 1.6% of families and 2.4% of the population were below the poverty line, including none of those under age 18 and 1.2% of those age 65 or over.

References

Census-designated places in Ocean County, New Jersey
Manchester Township, New Jersey
Populated places in the Pine Barrens (New Jersey)